Martín Palisi (born 19 January 1988) is an Argentine professional footballer who plays as a midfielder for Club Comunicaciones.

Career
Palisi made the move into senior football with Atlanta in 2009. After forty-seven appearances in his first two seasons in Primera B Metropolitana, he made his bow in Primera B Nacional on 16 October 2011 during a 0–4 win away to Gimnasia y Esgrima; in a season which ended with relegation back to tier three. He took his overall match tally to one hundred and fifty-eight for Atlanta in the following four campaigns. Palisi joined Almirante Brown in January 2016 for a seven-month stint, before departing for Colombia after signing for Cúcuta Deportivo. Ten appearances followed, with his last game coming against Valledupar on 10 October.

On 27 July 2017, Palisi joined Alvarado of Torneo Federal A. His debut arrived on 17 September versus Deportivo Roca, prior to the midfielder netting his first goal for the club during a win over Rivadavia in October. Palisi moved up to Primera B Nacional with Santamarina in June 2018.

Career statistics
.

Honours
Atlanta
Primera B Metropolitana: 2010–11

References

External links

1988 births
Living people
Footballers from Buenos Aires
Argentine footballers
Association football midfielders
Argentine expatriate footballers
Expatriate footballers in Colombia
Argentine expatriate sportspeople in Colombia
Primera B Metropolitana players
Primera Nacional players
Categoría Primera B players
Torneo Federal A players
Club Atlético Atlanta footballers
Club Almirante Brown footballers
Cúcuta Deportivo footballers
Club Atlético Alvarado players
Club y Biblioteca Ramón Santamarina footballers
Ferro Carril Oeste footballers
Club Comunicaciones footballers